The Pink Feather Restaurant and Lounge, or simply the Pink Feather, was a restaurant and dive bar in Portland, Oregon's Powellhurst-Gilbert neighborhood, in the United States. The restaurant opened in 1957 and closed in October 2017. It was included in Willamette Week 2016 list of the best bars in East Portland.

See also
 List of defunct restaurants of the United States
 List of dive bars

References

External links

 The Pink Feather Restaurant and Lounge at Zomato

1957 establishments in Oregon
2017 disestablishments in Oregon
Defunct restaurants in Portland, Oregon
Dive bars in Portland, Oregon
Powellhurst-Gilbert, Portland, Oregon
Restaurants disestablished in 2017
Restaurants established in 1957
Defunct dive bars